Saranda forest is a dense forest in the hilly region of West Singhbhum, East Singhbhum, Saraikela district in the Indian state of Jharkhand. This area used to be the private hunting reserve of the Singh Deo family (the erstwhile royal family of Saraikela). The forest covers an area of 820 km². Saranda (Serengda) literally means "800 hills in local language."

Ho people inhabit the area, which is dotted with iron ore mining towns including Gua, Chiria, Kiriburu and Noamundi.

Sal (Shorea robusta) is the most important tree in the area and it seems to have a preference for the rocky soil of the area. Although sal is a deciduous tree and sheds its leaves in early summer, the forest undergrowth is generally evergreen, which has such trees as mangoes, jamun, jackfruit, and piar. Other important trees are mahua, kusum, tilai, harin hara (Armossa rohitulea), gular (Ficus glomerata), and asan.
 
The reserved forests are the haunt of many animals. Wild elephants are common in Saranada  and Porahat forests. It is an important overlapping habitat of the elephants from adjacent Kedunjhar (Keonjhar) district of Orissa. Herds of sambar and chital roam about the forests. Bison is still found. Tigers were never numerous but they are there. Leopards are more common.

1100 hectares of virgin forests of >40% canopy cover is under iron ore mining leases. Several new aspirants for mining lease are in the waiting. The perennial rivers, Karo and Koina, pass through these forested areas supporting a diverse floral and faunal resource. However 70-80% of the forests were destroyed, trees harvested. The site is facing an ecological crisis.

The area was previously disturbed by Maoist and Naxal influences, but problems have subsided in recent years, and it has turned out to be a major tourist hub. There are many tourist places in the Manoharpur region. The peak season between October and March is now brimming with tourists.

References

West Singhbhum district
Forests of India
Geography of Jharkhand